Baadur is a given name. Notable people with the name include:

Baadur Jobava (born 1983), Georgian chess grandmaster
Baadur Tsuladze (1935–2018), Georgian actor, film director, writer, and broadcaster

Masculine given names